Anna Mayis Kostanyan (born 17 January 1987), is an Armenian politician, Member of the National Assembly of Armenia of Bright Armenia's faction.

References 

1987 births
Living people
21st-century Armenian women politicians
21st-century Armenian politicians
Politicians from Yerevan
Bright Armenia politicians